The  IQA World Cup III was the 2009 edition of the IQA World Cup (now the US Quidditch Cup), a quidditch club tournament then organized by the Intercollegiate Quidditch Association. It was held on Sunday, October 25, 2009, at Middlebury College in Middlebury, Vermont.

Hosting team Middlebury College won the tournament. They won all six games they played, and defeated Emerson College 60–10 in the final. Middlebury has won the first five IQA World Cup.

Qualifying teams

Bracket phase

See also

 Muggle quidditch
 International Quidditch Association

References

US Quidditch Cup
2009 in sports in Vermont
2009 in American sports
Sports competitions in Vermont
October 2009 sports events in the United States